Markham Colliery may refer to:

Markham Colliery at Staveley, Chesterfield, Derbyshire, England, site of the Markham Colliery disaster
Markham Colliery in Markham, Caerphilly, Wales
Markham Main Colliery near Doncaster, England